This is a list of animated television series first aired in 2015.

See also 
List of animated feature films of 2015 – Lists animation films released in 2015
List of Japanese anime television series of 2015  – Lists Japanese anime television shows premiered in 2015

References

Television series
Animated series
2015
2015
2015-related lists